Dylan Carlson (born March 12, 1968) is an American musician, best known as the guitarist and founder of the drone metal/post-rock group Earth, and the main contributor to his solo project Drcarlsonalbion.

Early life and education
Carlson was born in Seattle, Washington, United States. His father worked for the Department of Defense, and, as a result, as a child he moved quite frequently, living in Philadelphia, Texas, New Mexico, and New Jersey, before coming back to live in Washington state.

Career
He had first become interested in being a rock musician at age 15, inspired by bands such as Molly Hatchet, AC/DC, and Black Sabbath. He also cites the Melvins, and composers La Monte Young and Terry Riley as major influences on his music. It was in Olympia, Washington that he met Slim Moon, Greg Babior, Dave Harwell and Joe Preston, with whom he would later form Earth. During this time, he would often make "sonic collages" with his then-roommate Kurt Cobain. From 1991 to 1996, Earth had an ever-changing lineup. Carlson attributes a lack of (full-length) studio album recordings from 1997 to 2005 to "legal and drug problems".

Personal life
Carlson was a good friend of Kurt Cobain of Nirvana and, like Cobain, has struggled with heroin addiction, particularly so after Cobain's death. In his biography of Cobain, Heavier Than Heaven, Charles R. Cross asserted that "In Bloom" was a "thinly disguised portrait" of Carlson.
He now lives in recovery of heroin addiction. He has survived a rare form of Hepatitis B and liver failure. Carlson was married to fellow Earth drummer Adrienne Davies for a time. Davies still remains in the band despite their split-up. Carlson was married to a London-born artist, belly dancer, and performer named Holly. A picture of her profile was used as the album cover art for his solo album Conquistador.

Solo discography

Gold (as Drcarlsonalbion) (2014)
Falling with a 1000 Stars and other wonders from the House of Albion (with Coleman Grey) (2016)
Conquistador (2018)

References

External links

Earth's MySpace page
Extensive Earth Interview
Dylan's Interview with I Heart Noise

Grunge musicians
American indie rock musicians
Sub Pop artists
Musicians from Seattle
1968 births
Living people
American experimental guitarists
American male guitarists
American heavy metal guitarists
American post-rock musicians
Guitarists from Washington (state)
20th-century American guitarists
20th-century American male musicians
Earth (American band) members